The Big Ten Defensive Player of the Year is an annual award given out at the conclusion of the Big Ten regular season to the best defensive player in the conference as voted by a media panel and the head coaches of each team who is not a goaltender.

The Defensive Player of the Year was first awarded in 2014.

Award winners

Winners by school

Winners by position

References

College ice hockey trophies and awards in the United States
Defensive Player of the Year